Saruni may refer to:
 Saruni-ye Olya
 Saruni-ye Sofla